The flag of Rhineland-Palatinate, also known as Rhineland-Pfalz, is a tricolor of three horizontal bands of black, red and gold.  These colors are Germany's national colors and are sometimes referred to as schwarz-rot-gold.  In the canton, or the upper left corner, is the coat of arms of the state of Rhineland-Palatinate.

See also 

 Flags of German states

References

Culture of Rhineland-Palatinate
Rhineland-Palatinate
Rhineland-Palatinate
Rhineland-Palatinate